Veljko Petković (Serbian Cyrillic: Вељко Петковић, born January 23, 1977) is a Serbian volleyball player who competed for Yugoslavia in the 2000 Summer Olympics.

References 
 OKS – Volleyball men 2000
  Volleyball forever

1977 births
Living people
Expatriate volleyball players in Poland
Medalists at the 2000 Summer Olympics
Olympiacos S.C. players
Olympic gold medalists for Federal Republic of Yugoslavia
Olympic medalists in volleyball
Olympic volleyball players of Yugoslavia
Serbia and Montenegro men's volleyball players
Serbian expatriate sportspeople in France
Serbian expatriate sportspeople in Greece
Serbian expatriate sportspeople in Montenegro
Serbian expatriate sportspeople in Russia
Serbian expatriate sportspeople in Slovenia
Serbian expatriate sportspeople in Turkey
Serbian men's volleyball players
Volleyball players at the 2000 Summer Olympics
Yugoslav men's volleyball players